Safonovsky is a rural locality (a khutor) in Rossoshinskoye Rural Settlement, Uryupinsky District, Volgograd Oblast, Russia. The population was 137 as of 2010. There is 1 street.

Geography 
Safonovsky is located 31 km southwest of Uryupinsk (the district's administrative centre) by road. Rossoshinsky is the nearest rural locality.

References 

Rural localities in Uryupinsky District